I Love the Life I Live was a jazz and blues album by the American musician Mose Allison, released in 1960.

Allison became notable for playing a unique mix of blues and modern jazz, both singing and playing piano. After moving to New York in 1956, he worked primarily in jazz settings, playing with jazz musicians like Stan Getz, Al Cohn, and Zoot Sims, along with producing numerous recordings.

Track listing 
All compositions by Mose Allison except as indicated
 "I Love the Life I Live" (Willie Dixon) – 2:22
 "News" – 3:11
 "Fool's Paradise" (Johnny Fuller, Bob Geddins, David Rosenbaum) – 3:29
 "You Turned the Tables on Me" (Sidney Mitchell, Louis Alter) – 3:51
 "Isobel" (Al Cohn) – 4:26
 "You're a Sweetheart" (Harold Adamson, Jimmy McHugh) – 2:11
 "Night Ride" – 3:12
 "Path" – 3:33
 "Mad with You" (Lightnin' Hopkins) – 2:10
 "Hittin' on One" – 3:30
 "I Ain't Got Nobody" (Roger Graham, Spencer Williams) – 1:51
 "Can't We Be Friends" (Paul James, Kay Swift) – 4:25
 "A Pretty Girl Is Like a Melody" (Irving Berlin) – 3:18 (bonus track on CD)
 "Am I Blue" (Harry Akst, Grant Clarke) – 3:24 (bonus track on CD)

Personnel 
On tracks 3, 4, 7, 8, and 9 (recorded June 28 and July 5, 1960):
Mose Allison – piano, vocals
Addison Farmer – bass
Jerry Segal – drums

On tracks 1, 2, 6, and 10 (recorded June 30, 1960):
Mose Allison – piano, vocals
Henry Grimes – bass
Paul Motian – drums

On tracks 5, 11, and 12 (recorded September 9, 1960):
Mose Allison – piano, vocals
Bill Crow – bass
Gus Johnson – drums

References 

 Mose Allison: Discography. AllMusic.com

Mose Allison albums
1960 albums
Albums produced by Teo Macero